The discography of the hip hop group Styles of Beyond.

Studio albums 
 2000 Fold (1997, Bilawn)
 Megadef (2003, Spy Tech)
 Reseda Beach (2012, Dirty Version)

Singles and EPs 

 "Killer Instinct" (1997, Bilawn)
 "Many Styles" (1998, Ideal)
 "Spies Like Us" (1998, Bilawn)
 "Atomic Zen" (Split with Emanon) (1999, Rocketship)
 "Easy Back It Up" (1999, Hi-Ho)
 "Spies Like Us" (Remix) (1999, Ideal)
 "Ambiguous Figures" (Split with Ugly Duckling) (1999, Loosegroove/No Mayo)
 "Word Perfect" (Split with Dilated Peoples) (1999, Rah Rah)
 "Subculture" (2001, Spy Tech)
 "Subculture" (The projectHUMAN Remixes) (2002, Human Imprint)
 "Mr. Brown" (2003, Ill Boogie)
 "Pay Me" (2003, Spy Tech/Ill Boogie)
 "Style Tips" (2006, Spy Tech)
 Styles of Beyond: Grant Mohrman Remixes (Download only) (2007, Position)
 "Damn (featuring Michael Bublé)" (2012, Dirty Version)

Music videos 

 "Easy Back It Up"
 "Spies Like Us"
 "Spies Like Us (Remix)"
 "Be Your Dog"
 "Pay Me"
 "Bleach"

Mixtapes 

 Razor Tag (Presented by DJ Green Lantern) (2007)
 Razor Tag: Key Cuts EP (2007)

Compilation appearances 

 The World Famous Beat Junkies Volume 2 (1998, Blackberry) (Song: "Style Wars")
 O.L.C. (1999, Rah Rah) (Song: "Word Perfect")
 The Funky Precedent (1999, Loosegroove) (Song: "Ambiguous Figures")
 ProjectHUMAN (2002, Human Imprint) (Songs: "Subculture" (Dieselboy + Kaos VIP Remix) and "Subculture" (Dylan + Ink Remix))
 Perfecto Presents Ultra Music Festival: 01 (2003, Thrive) (Song: "Subculture" (Dieselboy + Kaos VIP Remix))
 The Mic Planet Sessions (2003, Insomniac) (Song: "Atomic Zen")
 Who's America? (2004, System) (Song: "Subculture" (Dieselboy + Kaos VIP Remix))
 DJ /rupture vs. Mutamassik Shotgun Wedding Vol. 1—The Bidoun Sessions (2004, Violent Turd) (Song: "Mr. Brown" (Biddy Bi-Bi Remix Instrumental))
 Very Special People (2004, Val Jerk) (Song: "The Real")
"NFS: Most Wanted [2005]" (2006, EA) (Song: "Nine Thou (Superstars Remix)")
 The Human Resource (2006, Human Imprint) (Song: "Subculture" (Upbeats Remix))
 Transformers: The Album (2007, Warner Bros.) (Song: "Second to None")
 Sound Chronicles Volume One (2007, Soundchron) (Song: "The Real")
 URB Sampler 99.02 (1999, URB Magazine) (Song: "Back it Up")

Guest appearances 

 Space Boy Boogie X – "Underground Sound" (Split single with The Pharcyde) (1999, Soul Unit)
 Divine Styler – "Nova" and "Microphenia" from Wordpower, Vol. 2: Directrix (1999, Mo' Wax)
 Divine Styler – "Terraform" from Contemplation Sompilation (2001, Electromatrix)
 Mountain Brothers – "Microphone Phenomenal" (Remix) (2002, Babygrande)
 Apathy – "Can't Nobody" from Where's Your Album?!! Mixtape (2004, Demigodz)
 Celldweller – "Shapeshifter" Single (2005, Fixt Music)
 Celph Titled – "Playin' with Fire" from The Gatalog: A Collection of Chaos (2006, Demigodz/Endless)
 Apathy – "Live at the BBQ", "Godz in da Front", and "Bring It Back" from Hell's Lost & Found: It's The Bootleg, Muthafuckas! Volume 2 (2007, Demigodz/Endless)
 4-Zone – "Off Safety" Sound Chronicles Volume One Compilation (2007, Soundchron)
 Common – "Back Home" from The Uncommon Collection Vol. 2 (2008, white label)

With Fort Minor 

 We Major (mixtape) (2005, Machine Shop Recordings/Warner Bros.)
 "Believe Me" (2005, Machine Shop Recordings/Warner Bros.)
 "Petrified" (2005, Machine Shop Recordings/Warner Bros.)
 The Rising Tied (2005, Machine Shop Recordings/Warner Bros.)

Solo releases

Ryu
Solo Tracks:
Paper Planes - (With Veze Skante) 
The Most Shady - (Produced by Scoop DeVille)
Guest appearances:
Tweekend (Name of the Game and Ready for Action)
Tropic Thunder soundtrack (2008, Lakeshore) (Song: "Name of the Game" (The Crystal Method's Big Ass T.T. Mix))
Unsung Heroes - (Gatorade Commercial) 
Algae - (with Talksicc) 
Rock (Remix) - (with Lexicon) 
The OfficiaL - (with Lexicon) 
Keep The Rats Movin - (with Awol One) 
Speak Ya Clout - (with Apathy) 
Dawn of the Decade - (with Emanon)
O'Doyle Rules - (with Apathy, Mac Lethal and various artists)
 Recharged (with Linkin Park) (Song: "Skin to Bone (Nick Catchdubs Remix) (with Cody B. Ware))

Get Busy Committee
NOTE: Get Busy Committee is a creative project formed by Ryu, Apathy of Demigodz, and producer Scoop DeVille.
Digital/Promo Singles
My Little Razor Blade - (2008) (Ryu, Apathy)
Come Talk To Me - (2009) (Ryu, Apathy, Prod. Scoop DeVille)
No Time To Speak - (2009) (Ryu, Apathy, Prod. Scoop DeVille)
 Soundtracks
 The Raid: Redemption soundtrack - (2012) (Song: "Suicide Music")

Tak 
Solo Tracks:
Heartless Game
Lady Killa (Produced by Voski, from The Gold Rush)
Solo Albums/EPs:
Red Rum - (Single with Josy B.)
The Publik Bizzares EP - (Instrumental EP)
Taknology - (Upcoming/TBA EP)
Whiskey Hill - (Upcoming/TBA debut solo album)

Cheapshot 
Vinyl:
Cheapshot's Sucka' Breaks: Beat (Downs), Cuts & Nosebleeds - (1998 12" vinyl release)
Mixtapes:
Mega Dudical! - (CD/2007)
Party Mouth! - (CD/2007, with DJ Marshall Barnes)
Jazzercidal Tendencies - (CD/2008)
Club Footed - (CD/2009)
Mega Dudical 2! - (Upcoming/TBA)

References 

Discographies of American artists
Hip hop discographies